Rääkjärv is a lake of Estonia.

See also
List of lakes of Estonia

Lakes of Estonia
Alutaguse Parish
Lakes of Ida-Viru County